Massimina Fantastici Rosellini (8 June 1789 Florence - 24 January 1859 Lucca) was an Italian writer and poet.

She studied at the Florentine college of Sant'Agata, where she became a friend of the future Countess Mastai-Ferretti.  In 1805, she left her studies at sixteen to marry Luigi Rosellini, personal secretary of Maria Luisa, Duchess of Lucca. She was very passionate in drawing, painting and in the art of illuminating. She  attended literary salons, where she met, Giovanni Battista Niccolini, Ugo Foscolo, and the abbot Pietro Bagnoli.

Works 
 Cefalo e Procri, Rovigo, 1835
 Per la Venere italica scolpita da Antonio Canova,

References 

1789 births
1859 deaths
Italian writers
Italian women writers